The 5th Sarasaviya Awards festival (Sinhala: 6වැනි සරසවිය සම්මාන උලෙළ), presented by the Associated Newspapers of Ceylon Limited, was held to honor the best films of 1967 Sinhala cinema on April 25, 1968, at the Colombo Girls' College, Sri Lanka. Honorable Prime Minister Dudley Senanayake was the chief guest at the awards night.

The film Sath Samudura won the most awards with eight including Best Film.

Awards

References

Sarasaviya Awards
Sarasaviya